Catacomb is a 2-D top-down third-person shooter created, developed, and published by Softdisk. It was originally created for the Apple II, and later ported to the PC. It should not be confused with The Catacomb, which is the second game in the series (originally named Catacomb II, but later renamed). It supports EGA and CGA graphics.

All the Catacomb titles, including the Catacomb 3D games, are now distributed legally by Flat Rock Software through their own web store and via GOG.com. The source code to the game was released by Flat Rock in June 2014 under GNU GPL-2.0-or-later in a manner similar those done by id Software and partners.

Gameplay 
In the game the player assumes the role of the magician Petton Everhail, who is contacted by Terexin, High Wizard of the Kieralon, who tells how the Kieralon Empire has fallen and how the player must travel to the Kieralon Palace to collect and split his treasures. Catacomb consists of fifteen levels in the Apple II version, ten levels in the PC demo disk promoting Gamer's Edge, and 30 levels in the full PC version (The Catacomb, aka Catacomb II). To progress to the next level the player must step through a magic teleportation mirror.  These mirrors are usually behind a locked door, requiring a key to advance. There are four different attacks: Fireball, Super Fireball, Bolt (powerful strike in one direction), Nuke (powerful strike in all four directions).
The Fireball and Super Fireball attacks can be cast an infinite number of times. The Bolt and Nuke consume a scroll each time they are cast.  The player starts the game with three Bolt scrolls and two Nuke scrolls. Additional scrolls are scattered through the levels. There are five different enemies: Goblin, Skeleton, Ogre, Gargoyle and Dragon.

See also
 Catacomb 3-D

References

External links 
 
Catacomb source code on GitHub
CatacombSDL source port
Catacomb Wiki

1990 video games
Apple II games
DOS games
Top-down video games
Video games developed in the United States
Commercial video games with freely available source code
Open-source video games
Softdisk